Forshki-ye Chukam (also Romanized as Forshkī-ye Chūkām; also known as Forshkī) is a village in Chukam Rural District, Khomam District, Rasht County, Gilan Province, Iran. At the 2006 census, its population was 1,198, in 344 families.

References 

Populated places in Rasht County